Camillo Passera (born 24 March 1965) is a former Italian racing cyclist. He rode in six Grand Tours between 1987 and 1991.

References

External links

1965 births
Living people
Italian male cyclists
Cyclists from Varese